With One Voice is a 2009 documentary directed by Eric Temple and written by Carol and Matthew Flickstein exploring the unity of humanity, featuring mystics from around the world, whose lives have been dedicated to answering the mysteries of existence.

References

External links
 
 For Further Information on Film

2009 documentary films
2009 films
American documentary films
Documentary films about spirituality
2000s English-language films
2000s American films